The 1984 Taipei International Championships was a men's tennis tournament played on indoor carpet courts in Taipei, Taiwan that was part of the 1984 Volvo Grand Prix. It was the eighth and last edition of the tournament and was held from 29 October through 4 November 1984. First-seeded Brad Gilbert won the singles title.

Finals

Singles
 Brad Gilbert defeated  Wally Masur 6–3, 6–3
 It was Gilbert's 2nd singles title of the year and the 3rd of his career.

Doubles
 Ken Flach /  Robert Seguso defeated  Drew Gitlin /  Hank Pfister 7–6, 6–4

References

External links
 ITF tournament edition details

Taipei Summit Open